CFUV-FM is a campus/community radio station broadcasting on 101.9 FM in British Columbia, Canada. It serves the University of Victoria, Greater Victoria and, via cable, Vancouver Island and many areas in the Lower Mainland. It is owned and run by the University of Victoria Student Radio Society.

CKVC, the precursor to CFUV was on air from 1965 until 1970 and had a broadcast range that included the Student Union Building as well as two student residence buildings.
The campus radio returned in 1981 after the UVic Campus Radio Club formed. CFUV became Victoria's second FM radio station on December 17, 1984, broadcasting at 49.4 watts on 105.1 FM.

In 1987 CFUV aimed to increase its transmission power to over 2000 watts. Approval was granted by the Canadian Radio-television and Telecommunications Commission (CRTC) in September 1988; in January 1989, CFUV started broadcasting on 101.9 FM at 2290 watts. Concurrently, CFUV arranged cable broadcast all over Vancouver Island (in most areas cable 104.3 FM).

CFUV is a not-for-profit, non-commercial, volunteer-based radio station. It is a member of the National Campus and Community Radio Association, and hosted the National Campus and Community Radio Conference in 1998 and 2014. CFUV is funded mainly by a levy on undergraduate studies at the University of Victoria, as well as by donations.

CFUV's mandate indicates that the station is focused on: providing opportunities for University of Victoria and community members to train in broadcasting and operating a radio station; providing informative, innovative, and alternative radio programming; and promoting Canadian and local artists through its broadcasting and related activities. Its programming is composed of spoken word (news, public affairs, poetry), music (rock, hip-hop, jazz, folk), and multicultural programs (in Finnish, Italian, etc.).

Offbeat Magazine, CFUV's listings guide, was delivered around Vancouver Island and the Lower Mainland, but is now defunct.

References

External links
 CFUV
 
 National Campus and Community Radio Association
 

Fuv
Fuv
University of Victoria
Radio stations established in 1984
1984 establishments in British Columbia